The 2013 Naisten Liiga, part of the 2013 Finnish football season, was the 7th season of the Finnish women's premier division Naisten Liiga since its establishment in 2007. The season started on 23 March 2013 and ended on 19 October 2013. Åland United were the defending champions, having won their first Finnish championship in 2012.

The season featured 10 teams. After 18 matches played, the league was divided to Championship Group of six and Relegation Group of four. The Champion, Åland United, qualified for the first qualifying round of the 2014–15 UEFA Women's Champions League and GBK Kokkola was relegated to the Naisten Ykkönen for the 2014 season. Merilappi United was promoted.

Teams

Preliminary stage

Championship group 
Note: Matches and points of Preliminary stage are counted

Relegation group 
Note: Matches and points of Preliminary stage are counted

Top scorers

Sources 
2013 Naisten Liiga Finnish Football Association

References

External links 
Naisten Liiga Official Homepage (in Finnish)

Kansallinen Liiga seasons
Naisten
Finland
Naisten